The 1978 United States Senate election in Alaska was held on November 7, 1978. Incumbent Republican U.S. Senator Ted Stevens was re-elected to a third term in office, defeating Democrat Donald Hobbs.

Open primary

Candidates

Democratic
 Donald W. Hobbs, candidate for Senate in 1974
 Joseph A. Sonneman, attorney and photographer from Juneau

Republican
Ted Stevens, incumbent Senator

Results

General election

Results

See also 
 1978 United States Senate elections

References 

Alaska
1978
1978 Alaska elections